Owusu Ampomah (born 6 February 1985) is a Ghanaian former professional footballer who played as a striker.

Career
Ampomah was born in Accra. He played for Cornerstones, Liberty Professionals F.C., RedBull South Africa, Kumasi Envoys, King Faisal Babes and German club SC Freiburg.

References

External links
 

1985 births
Living people
Footballers from Accra
Association football forwards
Ghanaian footballers
2. Bundesliga players
King Faisal Babes FC players
SC Freiburg players
Cornerstones F.C. players
Ghanaian expatriate footballers
Ghanaian expatriate sportspeople in Germany
Expatriate footballers in Germany
Ghanaian expatriates in South Africa
Expatriate soccer players in South Africa